Quarterly Journal may refer to:
 AIPLA Quarterly Journal
 Quarterly Journal of Austrian Economics
 Quarterly Journal of Economics
 Quarterly Journal of Engineering Geology & Hydrogeology
 Quarterly Journal of Experimental Psychology
 Quarterly Journal of Mathematics
 Quarterly Journal of Medicine
 Quarterly Journal of Microscopical Science
 The Quarterly Journal of Pure and Applied Mathematics
 Quarterly Journal of Science
 Quarterly Journal of Speech
 Quarterly Journal of Studies on Alcohol
 Quarterly Journal of the Chemical Society
 Quarterly Journal of the Geological Society of London
 Quarterly Journal of the Royal Astronomical Society
 Quarterly Journal of the Royal Meteorological Society
The Quarterly Journal, published by Personal Freedom Outreach, Christian organisation